Eupithecia valdivia is a moth in the family Geometridae. It is found in the region of Los Lagos (Valdivia Province) in Chile. Its habitat is the Valdivian temperate rain forest.

The length of the forewings is about 10 mm. Both the fore- and hindwings are covered with a mixture of greyish white, dark brown, and brownish black scales. Adults have been recorded on wing in October.

Etymology
The specific name is based on the type locality.

References

Moths described in 1987
valdivia
Moths of South America
Endemic fauna of Chile
Fauna of the Valdivian temperate rainforest